Látky is a village and municipality in Detva District, in the Banská Bystrica Region of central Slovakia.

References

External links
http://www.látky.sk Official homepage
http://látky.e-obce.sk

Villages and municipalities in Detva District